The Hill School is a boarding school in Pottstown, Pennsylvania, United States.

The Hill School may also refer to:

 The Hill School (New Orleans), a private Waldorf school in Louisiana, United States
 The Hill School (Virginia), a private school in Middleburg, Virginia, United States
 The Hill School Of Fort Worth, a private school in Fort Worth, Texas, United States
 The Hill School, a school run by the Hill family at Bruce Castle in Tottenham, London, 1827–1891

See also
 The Hill (disambiguation)
 Hill-Murray School, a private Catholic school in Maplewood, Minnesota, United States that was established via the amalgamation of Hill High School and Archbishop Murray Memorial High School
 School Hill, Wisconsin, an unincorporated community in Meeme, Manitowoc County, Wisconsin, United States
 School on the Hill a school in Sighișoara, Romania
 Hill House School (disambiguation)